The Saturn C-2 was the second rocket in the Saturn C series studied from 1959 to 1962. The design was for a four-stage launch vehicle that could launch 21,500 kg (47,300 lb) to low Earth orbit and send 6,800 kg (14,900 lb) to the Moon via Trans-Lunar Injection.
The C-2 design concept was for a proposed crewed circumlunar flight and the Earth orbit rendezvous (EOR) missions.  It was initially considered for the Apollo lunar landing at the earliest possible date (1967).

Launch vehicle requirements
On 30 September 1960, the fourth meeting of the Space Exploration Program Council was held at NASA Headquarters. 
The results of a study on Saturn development and utilization were presented by the Ad Hoc Saturn Study Committee. 
Objectives of the study were to determine:

 If and when the Saturn C-2 launch vehicle should be developed.
 If mission and spacecraft planning was consistent with the Saturn vehicle development schedule.

Since no change in the NASA FY1962 budget was contemplated, the Committee recommended that the Saturn C-2 development should proceed on schedule (S-II stage contract in FY 1962, with first flight in 1965).

The C-2 would be essential for Apollo crewed circumlunar missions, lunar uncrewed exploration, Mars and Venus orbiters and capsule landers, probes to other planets and out-of-ecliptic, and for orbital starting of nuclear upper stages. During a discussion on the Saturn program, several major problems were brought up:

 The adequacy of the Saturn C-1 launch vehicle for the orbital qualification of the complete Apollo spacecraft was in question. Although the C-1 could be used to launch a command module of 5,100 pounds, it was probable that the command module weight would increase to as much as 8,000 pounds, George M. Low of NASA Headquarters, in a critical review of the Apollo program, pointed out that a spacecraft for a circumlunar mission could be constructed within the payload limit of the C-2 launch vehicle. Both the developmental and production spacecraft could be available to meet the Saturn schedules.
 Much basic research would be needed before the first Apollo flight, In particular, the problem of reentry heating was of great concern. Low noted that a prediction criterion for proton beam events had been developed, making possible safe crewed circumlunar flights insofar as the radiation exposure problem was concerned.
 Concern was also expressed as to the possible need and availability of additional personnel to support the Apollo program.

Changing configurations
During 1961 Saturn C-x configurations seemed to change month by month.  In February 1961, the C-2 design finalized as a three-stage vehicle for Earth-escape missions, using an S-II second stage.  It was calculated that 15 launches and rendezvous of the C-2 would have been required to assemble a lunar spacecraft in Low Earth orbit. By May 1961, a more powerful vehicle was desired for circumlunar missions, hence the C-2 was dropped in favor of the Saturn C-3.  Further development of the C-2 vehicle was cancelled on 23 June 1961.

Launch vehicle design
The original Saturn C-2 design (1959-1960) was a four-stage launch vehicle, using an S-I first stage using eight Rocketdyne H-1 engines, later flown on the Saturn I. The Army's original design used the S-III stage with two J-2 engines as the second stage; after the Saturn program was transferred to NASA, the second stage was replaced with an S-II second stage using four J-2 engines.  The S-III stage would have been added atop the S-II, to convert the C-2 into the five-stage Saturn C-3. Later, a fifth J-2 engine was added to the S-II stage to be used on the Saturn C-5, which eventually was developed as the Saturn V launch vehicle.

The S-IV, later flown on the Saturn I, was to serve as the third C-2 stage and fourth C-3 stage; and an S-V Centaur would be the fourth C-2 stage.  While this S-V/Centaur stage would never fly on any Saturn rockets, it would be used on Atlas and Titan launch vehicles.  The Centaur is still in use on the Atlas V and the derived Delta Cryogenic Second Stage (DCSS) on the Delta IV.  The Advanced Cryogenic Evolved Stage is the latest proposed derivative as an upper stage replacement for the Vulcan rocket.

References 
Inline citations

Bibliography
Bilstein, Roger E, Stages to Saturn, US Government Printing Office, 1980. . Excellent account of the evolution, design, and development of the Saturn launch vehicles.
Stuhlinger, Ernst, et al., Astronautical Engineering and Science: From Peenemuende to Planetary Space, McGraw-Hill, New York, 1964.
 NASA, "Earth Orbital Rendezvous for an Early Manned Lunar Landing," pt. I, "Summary Report of Ad Hoc Task Group Study" [Heaton Report], August 1961.
 David S. Akens, Saturn Illustrated Chronology: Saturn's First Eleven Years, April 1957 through April 1968, 5th ed., MHR-5 (Huntsville, AL : MSFC, 20 Jan. 1971).
Free return trajectory simulation, Robert A. Braeunig, August 2008
Encyclopedia Astronautica Saturn C-2

C2
Cancelled space launch vehicles